The 1998 Birmingham City Council election took place on 7 May 1998 to elect members of  Birmingham City Council in the West Midlands, England. One third of the council was up for election and the Labour Party kept overall control of the council.

Result

References

1998
1998 English local elections
1990s in Birmingham, West Midlands